Sterol regulatory element-binding protein cleavage-activating protein, also known as SREBP cleavage-activating protein or SCAP is a protein that in humans is encoded by the SCAP gene.

SCAP contains a sterol-sensing domain (SSD) and seven WD domains. In cholesterol-depleted cells, this protein binds to sterol regulatory element binding proteins (SREBPs) and mediates their transport from the ER to the Golgi apparatus. The SREBPs are then proteolytically cleaved and stimulate sterol biosynthesis.

Function 

SCAP is a regulatory protein that is required for the proteolytic cleavage of the sterol regulatory element-binding protein (SREBP). SCAP is an integral membrane protein located in the endoplasmic reticulum (ER).  One of the cytosolic regions of SCAP contains a hexapeptide amino acid sequence, MELADL, that functions to detect cellular cholesterol. When cholesterol is present, SCAP undergoes a conformational change that prevents it from activating SREBP and cholesterol synthesis does not occur.

Structure 

Scap has 8 transmembrane domains and both the N-terminal and C-terminal face the cytoplasm. Also, it binds SREBP by a series of consecutive WD repeats on its C-terminus.

References

Further reading